The Forbes list of Australia's 50 richest people is a list of Australia's fifty wealthiest individuals and families, ranked by personal net worth published annually by Forbes Asia magazine. The list provides a short summary on some of the known business activities of the individuals and families, together with commentary on how their ranking has changed from the previous year, if listed. The list is published annually in January in an online format and updated daily, also online.

In 2019, the entry mark for the 50th richest individual was 750 million. The wealthiest individual in the 2019 list was Gina Rinehart, estimated to have a personal net worth of 14.8 billion; a 2.6 billion decrease in her personal net worth of 17.4 billion, as estimated by Forbes in 2018. 2019 marked the eighth time that Rinehart had headed the list.

Prior to 2013, the list included the forty richest people in Australia; expanded to Australia's fifty wealthiest individuals and families in 2013.

Lists by year
 Forbes list of Australia's 40 richest people, 2011
 Forbes list of Australia's 40 richest people, 2012
 Forbes list of Australia's 50 richest people, 2013
 Forbes list of Australia's 50 richest people, 2014
 Forbes list of Australia's 50 richest people, 2015
 Forbes list of Australia's 50 richest people, 2016
 Forbes list of Australia's 50 richest people, 2017
 Forbes list of Australia's 50 richest people, 2018
 Forbes list of Australia's 50 richest people, 2019

Members of Australia's 50 richest people
The table below is the list compiled by Forbes Asia, comparing movement from the previous year:

 Up until 2013, the list included Australia's 40 Richest people; expanded to Australia's 50 Richest people in 2013.

Former members of Australia's 50 richest people
The table below is an extract from the list compiled by Forbes Asia showing individuals who were once on the list yet are not on the current list. Where appropriate, the list compares movement from previous years:

 Paul Ramsay died in May 2014, five months after the 2014 list was published.
 Ian Norman died in May 2014, five months after the 2014 list was published.
 Bob Oatley died in January 2016, seven months after the 2015 list was published.
 Blair Parry-Okeden appeared on the list of Australians by net worth in 2016 only. She is a US-citizen and, despite living in Australia, is not eligible for admission on the list.

See also 

 Financial Review Rich List
 List of billionaires
 Lists of Australians
 List of Australian businesspersons
 List of wealthiest families

References

External links
Forbes.com: Forbes World's Richest People - By country of citizenship
Forbes.com: Forbes World's Richest People - By country of residence

 
Lists of 21st-century people
Australians by net worth
Australians by net worth
Wealth in Australia